Each of the 20 teams of Minor League Baseball's International League carry a 28-man active roster. Only these players are eligible to play. Teams may have additional players on their rosters who are inactive and do not count toward active roster limits provided no more than 38 players are on the roster at any given time.

Injured players may be placed on the injured list (7-day or 60-day). Major League Baseball players may be placed on rosters for injury rehabilitation for a maximum of 20 days for non-pitchers and 30 days for pitchers. Players may be placed on the development list for any non-disciplinary reason as long as they are not injured. The temporary inactive list is for players attending to personal matters. Active players may be placed on the reserve list to make them temporarily ineligible to play for the purposes of meeting active roster limits. Players failing to report to their major league club within 10 days of the season's start, including those with visa problems, may be placed on the restricted list. Players may be suspended due to insubordination or misconduct or for failing to reach playing condition within 60 days after the start of spring training. Those placed on the suspended list by their team do not count against active player limits, while those suspended by the league do count toward the limit.

Minor league players may be placed on their major league club's taxi squad to serve as back-up players on road trips while remaining on a minor league roster and not counting toward the active limit. They are not permitted to be in uniform or in the dugout during games, unless added to the lineup, but they may practice with the team.

Each team usually has at least a three-man coaching staff including a manager, hitting coach, and pitching coach. Depending on each major league organization's development approach, some teams may have additional coaches in addition to non-uniformed athletic trainers and strength and conditioning coaches.

East Division

Buffalo Bisons

Charlotte Knights

Durham Bulls

Jacksonville Jumbo Shrimp

Lehigh Valley IronPigs

Norfolk Tides

Rochester Red Wings

Scranton/Wilkes-Barre RailRiders

Syracuse Mets

Worcester Red Sox

West Division

Columbus Clippers

Gwinnett Stripers

Indianapolis Indians

Iowa Cubs

Louisville Bats

Memphis Redbirds

Nashville Sounds

Omaha Storm Chasers

St. Paul Saints

Toledo Mud Hens

See also
List of Pacific Coast League team rosters

References
Specific

General

International League
Rosters
International League team rosters